Pudhiya Raagam is a 1991 Indian Tamil language drama film written, directed and produced by Jayachitra, making her directorial debut with the film featuring herself in lead role with her son Amresh Ganesh (portraying child artist), Rahman and Raghuvaran, with Rupini, S. S. Chandran, Chinni Jayanth, Varun Raj and Kovai Sarala playing supporting roles. The film was released on 21 June 1991, and bombed at the box-office.

Plot 

The film starts with the famous singer Anuradha marrying Raghuraman. Four years later, Anuradha and Raghuraman are not happy with each other, and they don't have kids. Anuradha becomes a busy singer, while Raghuraman doesn't believe in hard work and wants to earn easy money. To finance his sister's wedding, Raghuraman starts to steal money from his wife and to sell her jewels without her knowledge. Even after Anuradha finally realises his trickery and lies, she can do nothing. Thereafter, Anuradha meets her former lover Raja who is now married and has a kid named Anu Mohan.

In the past, Anuradha helped Raja to become a good singer, Raja slowly fell in love with Anuradha. Whereas Raja's relative Sheela was in love with Raja and Sheela compelled him to marry her but Raja refused to marry her. After her suicide attempt, Raja was obliged to marry Sheela.

The situation gets tense when Raghuraman expels Anuradha's brother Gopi from the house and he openly confesses his affair to Anuradha with another woman. He is later arrested for fraud but Anuradha then brings out of the prison. Anuradha still likes her husband and she is determined to endure the suffering. Anuradha finds solace by playing with Raja's baby Anu Mohan, afterwards, Raja reveals that he is a widower. What transpires next forms the rest of the story.

Cast 

Jayachitra as Anuradha
Rahman as Raja
Raghuvaran as Raghuraman
Rupini as Sheela
Amresh Ganesh as Anu Mohan
S. S. Chandran as Jil
Chinni Jayanth as Vivek
Varun Raj as Gopi
Kovai Sarala as Bulbul
C. R. Saraswathi as Raghuraman's mother
Prathapachandran as Raghuraman's father
Omakuchi Narasimhan as Tavil
Gundu Kalyanam as Dholak
Singamuthu as Clarinet
Oru Viral Krishna Rao
Pandari Bai as Thaiyamma
S. N. Lakshmi as Raja's grandmother
T. S. Raghavendra as Raja's father
Typist Gopu
G. Srinivasan
Karikalan
A. Sakunthala
Crazy Venkatesh as Venkatesh
Gangai Amaran (cameo)

Soundtrack 
The film score and the soundtrack were composed by Ilaiyaraaja.

Tamil (original) version 
The soundtrack, released in 1991, features 5 tracks with lyrics written by Vaali and Kanmani Subbu.

Telugu (dubbed) version 
This soundtrack was released in Telugu as Anubandhalu and all lyrics were written by Rajasri.

References

External links 
 

1990s Tamil-language films
1991 directorial debut films
1991 drama films
1991 films
Films scored by Ilaiyaraaja
Indian drama films